Nikola Kokotović (7 September 1859, Gornji Kosinj, Habsburg monarchy – 6 January 1917, Zagreb, Austria-Hungary) was a Serbian and Croatian playwright and translator who lived and worked in Zagreb most of his life, though his translated plays were performed in Belgrade as well. He was born to Serb parents in Gornji Kosinj. He was a friend of Ognjeslav Utješenović Ostrožinski, August Harambašić, and Petar Preradović.

Works
 Bestidnici (Émile Augier's Les Effrontés), translated and premiered in 1889;
 Don Cezar od Bazana (Dumanoir and Adolphe d'Ennery's Don César de Bazan, based on the drama Ruy Blas by Victor Hugo), translated and first staged in Belgrade on 16 May 1877.

References 

1859 births
1917 deaths
Serbian dramatists and playwrights
Croatian dramatists and playwrights
Serbian translators
Croatian translators
19th-century Serbian writers
19th-century male writers
19th-century Croatian writers
People from Lika-Senj County
19th-century translators